The Men's discus throw athletics events for the 2020 Summer Paralympics took place at the Tokyo National Stadium from August 29 to September 3, 2021. A total of 5 events were contested in this discipline.

Schedule

Medal summary
The following is a summary of the medals awarded across all discus throw events.

Results

F11
Records

Prior to this competition, the existing world, Paralympic, and area records were as follows:

Results

The final in this classification took place on 2 September 2021, at 10:32:

F37
Records

Prior to this competition, the existing world, Paralympic, and area records were as follows:

Results

The final in this classification took place on 3 September 2021, at 10:55:

F52
Records

Prior to this competition, the existing world, Paralympic, and area records were as follows:

Results

The final in this classification took place on 29 August 2021, at 19:24:

CNC - Classification not Completed

F56
Records

Prior to this competition, the existing world, Paralympic, and area records were as follows:

Results

The final in this classification took place on 30 August 2021, at 9:35:

F64
Records

Prior to this competition, the existing world, Paralympic, and area records were as follows:

Results

The final in this classification took place on 2 September 2021, at 19:05:

References

Athletics at the 2020 Summer Paralympics
2021 in men's athletics